Myrtia may refer to the following places in Greece:

Myrtia, Aetolia-Acarnania, a village in Aetolia-Acarnania 
Myrtia, Euboea, a village in the island of Euboea 
Myrtia, Heraklion, a village in the Heraklion regional unit
Myrtia, Elis, a village in Elis 
Myrtia, Laconia, a village in Laconia